Joseph Paul Carollo (born March 25, 1940) is a former American football offensive tackle who play an eight-year career in the National Football League (NFL) for the Los Angeles Rams, Philadelphia Eagles, and the Cleveland Browns.  He played college football at the University of Notre Dame and was drafted in the second round of the 1962 NFL Draft.  Carollo was also selected in the eighteenth round of the 1962 AFL Draft by the Dallas Texans. He had a short career in professional wrestling from 1965 to 1967 where he worked in Texas, Hawaii, the Carolinas and Japan.

Professional Wrestling Career
During the 1965 off Carollo made his professional wrestling debut in San Diego. He would team with fellow footballer Don Chuy during most of his wrestling career. Carollo also worked in Texas, Hawaii, and the Mid-Atlantic with Chuy. In May 1966, Carollo went to Japan working for Japan Pro Wrestling Alliance. He teamed with Killer Karl Kox. On May 23, 1966, Carollo and Kox defeated Giant Baba and Michiaki Yoshimura to win the All Asia Tag Team Championship. Five days later they dropped the titles to Yoshimura and Hiro Matsuda. He returned to the States and reunited with Chuy in the Mid-Atlantic where he retired in 1967.

Championships and accomplishments
Japan Wrestling Association
All Asia Tag Team Championship (1 time) - with Killer Karl Kox

References

1940 births
Living people
American football offensive tackles
American people of Italian descent
Notre Dame Fighting Irish football players
Los Angeles Rams players
Philadelphia Eagles players
Cleveland Browns players
Western Conference Pro Bowl players
People from Wyandotte, Michigan
All Asia Tag Team Champions